The Whaleback Snow-Survey Cabin, about  north of Prospect in the Rogue River–Siskiyou National Forest in southwest Oregon, is a log cabin with a "snow tower" built in 1937. It is situated on the east slope of Whaleback Mountain. It was listed on the National Register of Historic Places in 2000.

Its logs are probably Shasta Red Fir. According to the NRHP nomination,The idea for the distinctive tower or "Santa Claus" chimney on the Whaleback cabin had evolved the year before during a winter expedition into South Lake. In January 1936, R.A. Work and a companion skied into South Lake to complete a snow survey. They reached the South Lake cabin site a little before dark but were unable to locate it. Work described their dilemma: "We couldn't find the log cabin. We knew where the cabin was supposed to be and we feared that maybe some hunters had burned it down... We got our snow-tubes out, went to the place where we believed the cabin to be and started "sounding." Sure enough, we hit wood. We kept sounding until we came over the ridgepole of the cabin roof... Then we started digging, with our skis and with our hand-axe... We dug a hole down eleven feet to get into that cabin.. .The next year we put a "chimney" entrance on the cabin, and then could climb down through the wooden "chimney" into the cabin, underneath the snowdrifts."

References

National Register of Historic Places in Douglas County, Oregon
Late 19th and Early 20th Century American Movements architecture
Buildings and structures completed in 1937
Log buildings and structures on the National Register of Historic Places in Oregon
1937 establishments in Oregon